Abdul Islam Nazir (born 7 July 1973 in Lahore) is a Pakistani former first-class cricketer active 1996–1998 who played for Lahore City. He was a right-handed batsman and a right-arm fast medium pace bowler. He represented the United States of America in the 1997 ICC Trophy.

References

1973 births
Living people
Pakistani cricketers
Lahore City cricketers
United States One Day International cricketers